Tom Gilmore (born 2 February 1994) is a rugby league footballer who plays as a  or  for the Widnes Vikings in the Betfred Championship.

He played for the Widnes Vikings in the Super League and the Championship, and on loan from Widnes at the North Wales Crusaders and the London Broncos in the Kingstone Press Championship. Gilmore has also played for Halifax in the Championship, and on loan from 'Fax at the Salford Red Devils in the Betfred Super League.

Background
Gilmore was born in St Helens, Merseyside, England.

Career

Widnes Vikings
He made his début as a substitute in the victory against the London Broncos in 2012, but his first starting appearance had to wait until April 2013 against the Huddersfield Giants.

On 26 February 2015 Gilmore joined the Broncos on a one-month loan deal.

Halifax
On 25 September 2020 it was announced that Gilmore would join Salford on loan.

Batley Bulldogs
On 17 November 2020 it was announced that Gilmore would join the Batley Bulldogs for the 2021 season.

Widnes Vikings (re-join)
On 10 October 2022 it was announced that Gilmore had re-joined the Widnes Vikings on a two-year deal.

International career
In July 2018 he was selected in the England Knights Performance squad.

References

External links
Widnes Vikings profile
SL profile

1994 births
Living people
Batley Bulldogs players
English rugby league players
Halifax R.L.F.C. players
London Broncos players
North Wales Crusaders players
Rugby league halfbacks
Rugby league players from St Helens, Merseyside
Salford Red Devils players
Widnes Vikings players